Trichacantha is a genus of flies in the family Athericidae.

Species
Trichacantha atranupta Stuckenberg, 1955

References

Athericidae
Brachycera genera
Taxa named by Brian Roy Stuckenberg
Diptera of Africa